Jaro Procházka (April 22, 1886 in Prague, Vyšehrad – September 30, 1949 in Prague) was a Czech painter specializing in cities and landscapes.

He studied at the Academy of Fine Arts, Prague under Prof. Jakesch (1900–1904), and then at the Academy of Fine Arts, where his studies were interrupted by the First World War. He was a member of the Union of Artists in Prague.

His work was influenced by the impressionist movement. During his lifetime he made study trips to Paris, Belgium, and the Netherlands. Paintings of Bruges and the Belgian countryside can be considered the pinnacle of his work. A set of paintings of European cities in 1931 was awarded the annual prize of the Academy of Sciences.

He exhibited his works in many solo and joint exhibitions in the Czech Republic and abroad, such as Paris, Oslo and Copenhagen.

Selected works
"View Of Prague", signed Iaro Prochazka (lower right) oil on canvas exhibited in Prague in 1936 with the group "Jednota".
"Kampa In Winter", oil on cardboard, 48 x 70 cm, framed, glazed, undated, signed lower right.
"Early Morning in Bruges"
"Spring Celebration", five naked children dancing in the blossoming spring orchard. Oil on canvas, 114 x 79 cm, bottom left side signed "J. Procházka".
"Krakow", view into historical town center. Oil on plywood, 40 x 28 cm, bottom right corner signed "J. Procházka".
"Evening landscape with the lake", view of the lake surrounded by trees with the setting Sun on the background and three little figures in front. Oil on a board, 23,5x33,5 cm (inside frame measurements), bottom right signed "Jaro Procházka". framed, glassed. Condition A.
"A Prague Corner", signed Jaro Procházka bottom right, oil/canvas, 50 x 65 cm, framed.
"On the stairs", oil on cardboard, 50 x 65 cm, framed, glazed, undated, signed lower right.
"Časně Ráno V Bruggách"
"A View Of The Lesser Quarter"
"The Market In Kampa"
"Im Waldesinneren"

See also
List of Czech painters
List of Czechs

References

1886 births
1949 deaths
Artists from Prague
20th-century Czech painters
Czech male painters
20th-century Czech male artists